Uijeongbu Station is a station on the Gyeongwon Line in South Korea.  It is also served by trains on Seoul Subway Line 1.

Exits
 Exit 1: Bus Terminal, Uijeongbu Paik General Hospital, Military Manpower Administration, Dongbu Plaza
 Exit 2: Uijeongbu District Public Prosecutor's Office, Gyeonggi Provincial Government 2nd Office, National Health Insurance Corporation, Korea Labor Welfare Corporation, Uijeongbu Police Station, Uijeongbu Fire Station, Uijeongbu City Hall, Uijeongbu Medical Center

References 

Seoul Metropolitan Subway stations
Metro stations in Uijeongbu
Railway stations opened in 1911